The 1958–59 season was Dinamo București's tenth season in Divizia A. Dinamo finishes second in the championship, one point behind the winners, Petrolul Ploiesti, but wins for the first time Cupa Romaniei. In this competition, Dinamo manages to pass by their main rivals, UTA, CCA, and Rapid. It is the first trophy for Iuliu Baratky as coach, after four Romanian Cups won as a player.

The beginning of the season was marked by a decision of FRF to forbid Dinamo and two other teams to have tournaments abroad. Later, because of poor results, the club sanctioned their players, Calinoiu, Dumitru, Anghel and Utu being suspended.

Results

Romanian Cup final

Transfers 

Before the start of the season Dinamo bought Iosif Varga (from CS Târgu Mureş), Iosif Bükössy (from CCA), Iosif Szakacs. Valentin Neagu (to Progresul), Petre Babone (to Petrolul), Iosif Lazăr and Florin Anghel (to Dinamo Bacău) left the club.

References 
 www.labtof.ro
 www.romaniansoccer.ro

1958
Association football clubs 1958–59 season
1958–59 in Romanian football